William Edward Herbert (1888–1928) was an English footballer who played for Bolton Wanderers, Glossop, Stoke and Wigan Borough.

Career
Herbert was born in Canning Town and began his career with Walthamstow Grange, Barnet Alston and an unsuccessful spell at Woolwich Arsenal before joining Second Division side Glossop North End in 1910. He played 18 times for Glossop scoring three goals and after a short spell with Gravesend United he joined Southern League side Stoke in December 1912. He helped the club again re-election to the Football League in 1914–15 and played for Stoke during World War I. He played 11 times for Stoke in their return to the League in 1919–20 but then signed for Bolton Wanderers in November 1919. He spent two and a half years at Burnden Park before ending his career with a season at Wigan Borough.

Career statistics
Source:

References

1888 births
1928 deaths
Footballers from Canning Town
English footballers
Association football inside forwards
Walthamstow Grange F.C. players
Barnet F.C. players
Arsenal F.C. players
Glossop North End A.F.C. players
Gravesend United F.C. players
Stoke City F.C. players
Bolton Wanderers F.C. players
Wigan Borough F.C. players
English Football League players
Southern Football League players
Date of birth missing
Date of death missing